Hydrobasileus is a small genus of dragonflies in the family Libellulidae, 
found in Southeast Asia, Indonesia, New Guinea, the Solomon Islands and Australia.

Species
The genus Hydrobasileus includes the following three species:

See also
 List of Odonata species of Australia

References

Libellulidae
Anisoptera genera
Odonata of Oceania
Odonata of Asia
Odonata of Australia
Taxa named by William Forsell Kirby
Insects described in 1889
Lists of insects